The following railroads operate in the U.S. state of Wyoming.

Common freight carriers

Bighorn Divide and Wyoming Railroad (BDW)
BNSF Railway (BNSF)
Canadian Pacific Railway (CP) through subsidiary Dakota, Minnesota and Eastern Railroad (DME)
Rapid City, Pierre and Eastern Railroad (RCPE)
Swan Ranch Railroad (SRRR)
Union Pacific Railroad (UP)
Wyoming Connect Railroad (WCT)

Defunct railroads

Passenger carriers
National Railroad Passenger Corporation (Amtrak).  Service along the former San Francisco Zephyr lasted from 1972 to 1983 and the Pioneer lasted only from 1992 to 1997.

Notes

References
Association of American Railroads (2003), Railroad Service in Wyoming (PDF). Retrieved May 11, 2005.

Wyoming
 
 
Railroads